IRIB Mostanad (Shibkâhi-ye Mistenud, Documentary channel) is a national documentary TV channel in Iran. It was launched on October 6, 2009 and is the first Iranian digital channel. This channel can be received both using set-top boxes and satellites.

IRIB Mostanad tries to provide interlingual subtitles to make the languages of different ethnic groups understandable to the audience.

Programs
This channel airs documentaries on culture, arts, society, politics, history, nature and the Iran–Iraq War.

Logos
The first logo of this channel was a square with a red globe inside. It paid homage to National Geographic Channel's logo.

See also
 Islamic Republic of Iran Broadcasting
 List of documentary channels

References

External links

IRIB Mostanad Live streaming

Islamic Republic of Iran Broadcasting
Television stations in Iran
Persian-language television stations
Television channels and stations established in 2011
Documentary television channels